The Bundesverband der Deutschen Luft- und Raumfahrtindustrie (BDLI) is a German association of companies and institutions in the aerospace industry with its headquarters in Berlin, Germany.

The association organizes the ILA Berlin Air Show in cooperation with Messe Berlin GmbH.

The association is a member of the Bundesverband der Deutschen Industrie (BDI). The BDLI is also a member of the Aerospace and Defence Industries Association of Europe (ASD), a European umbrella organization for the interests of the aerospace and defence industry.

Organization
The organization is divided into the four manufacturer groups: Equipment/Materials (Ausrüstung und Werkstoffe), Air Transport (Lufttransport), Defense and Security (Verteidigung und Sicherheit) sowie Space travel (Raumfahrt). Representatives of these four manufacturer groups form the executive committee and advisory board, which are the highest BDLI committees. There are also technical committees and forums.

Partner organizations
AeroSpace and Defence Industries Association of Europe (ASD) (Europe)
Groupement des industries françaises aéronautiques et spatiales (GIFAS) (France)

Membership
Full members (Ordentliche Mitglieder) can be German companies that are involved in aspects of aerospace. Supply and equipment companies that are active in the aerospace sector can also join the Federal Association as full members. Supporting members (Fördernde Mitglieder) can be companies, legal entities or natural persons who regularly transfer contributions to the BDLI.

History
On March 17, 1911, the Verein Deutscher Flugzeugindustrieller (later the Verband Deutscher Flugzeug-Industrieller GmbH) was founded. The founders were Albatros Flugzeugwerke, Aviatik GmbH, Dorner Flugzeuge GmbH, Flugmaschine Wright-Gesellschaft mbH, Euler-Flugmaschinenwerke, Grade-Fliegerwerke, Harlan-Flugzeugwerke and Rumpler-Flugzeugwerke AG.

From 1917 the association was a member of the Kriegsverband der Flugzeugindustrie e.V., an initiative of the Inspection of the Air Force (IdFlieg) with 120 companies and 125,000 employees (monthly production of 2,000 aircraft). In 1921, the association was merged with the Verein Deutscher Motorfahrzeug-Industrieller to form the Verband Deutscher Luftfahrzeug-Industrieller GmbH. The association was liquidated on September 17, 1923, and refounded on October 30, 1923, as the Verband Deutscher Luftfahrzeughersteller e.V. In 1927, it was again dissolved and founded as the Reichsverband der Deutschen Luftfahrt-Industrie (RDLI) with a new constitution after the withdrawal of Luft-Hansa in 1929.

During National Socialism, the association was incorporated as an independent economic group into the Main Group II of the German Economy. After the Second World War, the association was again called Verband der Deutschen Luftfahrt e.V. in 1951, but one year later it was renamed Verband zur Förderung der Luftfahrt e.V. (VFL) one year later. With the sovereignty of the Federal Republic of Germany in 1955 and the associated regaining of air sovereignty, the association was renamed Bundesverband der Deutschen Luftfahrtindustrie e.V. (BDLI).

Medienpreis Luft- und Raumfahrt
Together with the Deutsche Journalistenschule, the BDLI founded the Verein zur Förderung des technisch-wissenschaftlichen Journalismus in 2010, which awards the Deutscher Journalistenpreis für Luft- und Raumfahrt in succession to the Ludwig-Bölkow-Journalistenpreis, The prize was finally renamed Medienpreis Luft- und Raumfahrt when it was awarded in 2013. The prize is awarded to contributions by non-trade journalists who make the subject of aerospace accessible to a broad public. The prize is awarded annually in the categories print, radio and television, and is endowed with a total of 15,000 euros, donated by the BDLI.

Chairperson
1911-1927: August Euler
1927-1929: Walter Huth
1929-1951: Rudolf Lahs
1951-1954: Fritz Jastrow (resigned at the insistence of Ernst Heinkel)
1955-1963: Leo Rothe
1963-1971: Karl Thalau
1971-: Bernhard Weinhardt
Werner Knieper
Claude Dornier
1976-1982: Ludwig Bölkow
1984-1985: Ernst Zimmermann
1985-1988: Otto Greve
1988-: Hanns Arnt Birds
-1993: Karl Dersch
1993-1996: Wolfgang Piller
1996-1998: Manfred Bischoff
1998-2001: Gustav Humbert
2001-2005: Rainer Hertrich
2005-2012: Thomas Enders
2012-2013: Lutz Bertling
2013-2016: Bernhard Gerwert
2017-2019: Dr. Klaus Richter
2020-: Dirk Hoke

References

Space agencies
Lobbying in Germany
Industry in Germany